Tallanstown is a village in County Louth, Ireland. It lies on the R171 Regional road and on the banks of the River Glyde, 11 km southwest of Dundalk. It was the winner of the 2010 Tidy Towns competition.

References

External links
 Village website (archived)

Towns and villages in County Louth